Helene E. Weinstein (born September 6, 1952) is an American politician who represents District 41 in the New York State Assembly, which comprises Sheepshead Bay, Flatlands, East Flatbush, Midwood and Canarsie.

Biography
First elected in 1980, Weinstein currently chairs the Assembly's Ways and Means Committee and is a member of the standing committees on Aging, Codes, Rules . She previously chaired the Assembly Committee on Governmental Employees, Election law and Judiciary. And the Assembly Task Force on Women's Issues for seven years.

Weinstein chairs the Assembly Standing Committee on Judiciary. She is the first woman in New York State's history to be appointed to this position. The Judiciary Committee presides over virtually all legislation affecting the state's judicial system, Family and Domestic Relations Law, Trusts and Estates, as well as civil practice in the courts. Weinstein has sponsored major reforms in the state's jury system and is the leading proponent of ensuring civil legal services for low-income New Yorkers. Weinstein led the successful effort to increase 18B and Law Guardian rates. Weinstein is also a member of the Court Facilities Capital Review Board.

She has been involved in the drafting and passage of several key pieces of legislation, especially with respect to family law. She is the sponsor of the Family Protection and Domestic Violence Intervention Act, as well as the Child Support Standards Act.

Weinstein has previously served as an appointee of former Governor Mario Cuomo to the New York State Child Support Commission and the Governor's Commission on Domestic Violence.

Over her political career since 1998, the two groups contributing the greatest amounts to her campaigns have been trial lawyers/lobbyists and public sector unions.

On 14 March 2020, Weinstein tested positive for COVID-19.

Education
Weinstein holds a B.A. in Economics from American University as well as a degree from the New England School of Law.

Occupation
Weinstein is of counsel to her family's personal-injury law firm, Weinstein, Chase, Messinger & Peters, P.C.  She has been licensed to practice law in New York since 1977.

References

External links 
 New York Assembly Member Website
Key Votes from Project Vote Smart
Switch by a Former Supporter Shows Evolution of Death Law

Jewish American state legislators in New York (state)
Democratic Party members of the New York State Assembly
Women state legislators in New York (state)
Living people
1952 births
21st-century American politicians
21st-century American women politicians
American University alumni
New England Law Boston alumni
20th-century American politicians
20th-century American women politicians
21st-century American Jews